Bussetti is an Italian surname. Notable people with the surname include:

 Marco Bussetti (born 1962), Italian teacher and politician
 Paolo Bussetti, Italian swimmer

See also
Bussotti

Italian-language surnames